Bike SF 2010 are a set of 10 milestones established by then-Mayor of San Francisco Gavin Newsom on San Francisco's Bike to Work Day, May 17, 2007. The milestones are a set of comprehensive goals to measure the progress in making bike improvements to streets in San Francisco.

Bike SF 2010 Milestones 
1. Complete draft EIR of the San Francisco Bike Plan by June 1, 2008.
2. Complete planning work for bike safety improvements at 50 locations, including bike routes such as 2nd St., 17th St., Portola Drive, Masonic Ave., and key intersections such as Market/Valencia and Fell/Masonic.
3. Finish five-year funding plan for City’s bicycle improvement needs in the City, including 6-month progress updates to the Mayor’s Office beginning in July 2007.
4. Install 300 bike racks by 2010.
5. Stripe 20 new bike lanes by 2010.
6. Direct the Department of Public Works to place higher priority on official bike routes in regular street resurfacing process.
7. Actively support ‘Level of Service’ reform at the Planning Commission to better meet the needs of San Francisco’s Transit-First policy.
8. Reach 10 percent of trips by bicycle in San Francisco by 2010.
9. Reduce bicycle injury collisions by 50 percent by 2010.
10. Create a Mayor’s Working Group for bicycling improvements, which meets quarterly beginning in July 2007. This Working Group will include key departmental and community representatives.

See also 
San Francisco Bicycle Coalition

External links 
San Francisco Bicycle Coalition
Mayor Gavin Newsom's Bike SF 2010 press release

References 

Transportation in San Francisco